Independence Park is a cricket ground in Port Vila, Vanuatu. It hosted the matches in the 2019 ICC Women's Qualifier EAP tournament in May 2019.

References

Cricket grounds in Vanuatu
Sport in Vanuatu
Port Vila